Diego Jara Rodrigues (born 21 September 1995), commonly known as Diego, is a Brazilian footballer who currently plays as a left back for Kashiwa Reysol.

Club career
Diego joined Japanese side Matsumoto Yamaga in January 2017, on a 1-year loan from Brazilian side Joinville.

Career statistics

Club

Notes

References

External links

 Profile at Matsumoto Yamaga FC

1995 births
Living people
Brazilian footballers
Brazilian expatriate footballers
Association football defenders
Clube Atlético Metropolitano players
Joinville Esporte Clube players
Matsumoto Yamaga FC players
Mito HollyHock players
Tokushima Vortis players
Sagan Tosu players
Kashiwa Reysol players
Campeonato Brasileiro Série A players
Campeonato Brasileiro Série B players
J2 League players
J1 League players
Brazilian expatriate sportspeople in Japan
Expatriate footballers in Japan
Sportspeople from Mato Grosso do Sul